Park Ji-min (born October 13, 1995), known mononymously as Jimin, is a South Korean singer and dancer. In 2013, he made his debut as a member of the South Korean boy band BTS, under the record label Big Hit Entertainment.

Jimin has released three solo tracks under BTS' name—"Lie" in 2016, "Serendipity" in 2017, and "Filter" in 2020—all of which have charted on South Korea's Gaon Digital Chart. In 2018, he released his first credited solo song, the digital track "Promise", which he co-wrote. He recorded the duet "With You" with Ha Sung-woon for the soundtrack for the TvN drama Our Blues in 2022 and featured on Taeyang's single "Vibe" in 2023; his debut album, Face, is set to release in the same year as the latter.

Early life and education 
Park Ji-min was born on October 13, 1995, in Geumjeong District, Busan, South Korea. His immediate family includes his mother, father, and younger brother. When he was a child, he attended Busan's Hodong Elementary School and Yonsan Middle School. During middle school, he attended Just Dance Academy and learned popping and locking dance. Prior to becoming a trainee, Jimin studied contemporary dance at Busan High School of Arts and was a top student in the modern dance department. A teacher suggested that he join an entertainment company, leading him to Big Hit Entertainment. Once he passed the auditions in 2012, he transferred to Korean Arts High School, graduating in 2014.

Jimin graduated from Global Cyber University in August 2020 with a major in Broadcasting and Entertainment. As of 2021, he is enrolled at Hanyang Cyber University, pursuing a Master of Business Administration in Advertising and Media.

Career

2013–present: BTS 

Jimin debuted as a vocalist and dancer in BTS on June 13, 2013. Under the band's name, he released three solo songs: "Lie", "Serendipity", and "Filter". "Lie" was released in 2016, as part of the band's second Korean studio album, Wings. It was described as stunning and dramatic, conveying dark undertones and emotions in line with the overall concept of the album. In contrast, "Serendipity", from the band's Love Yourself: Her (2017) extended play (EP), was soft and sensual, expressing the joy, conviction, and curiosity of love. "Filter", a track from BTS' 2020 studio album Map of the Soul: 7, had a Latin pop flair, with lyrics reflecting the different sides of Jimin that he shows to the world and those around him.

"Serendipity" and "Lie" both surpassed fifty million streams on Spotify in 2018, followed shortly thereafter by the former's full length version from BTS' Love Yourself: Answer (2018) compilation album, which achieved the milestone in early 2019. Jimin became the first Korean artist to have three solo tracks accumulate over 50 million streams each, surpassing Psy, who was previously crossed the 50 million streams mark twice with "Gangnam Style" (2012) and "Gentleman" (2013). Both songs were also the only solos by a BTS member included in the Official Chart Companys (OCC) list of the top 20 most streamed BTS songs in the United Kingdom as of October 2018, ranking at number 17 and 19 respectively. In April 2019, the list was expanded to reflect the top 40, and both tracks were the highest ranked solos included that year, at numbers 18 and 20 respectively.

In May 2019, Jimin became the first BTS member to have a solo music video achieve 100 million views on YouTube when "Serendipity" surpassed the milestone. He remained the only BTS member with multiple solo songs in the January 2020 update of the OCC's top 40 list: "Lie" and "Serendipity" were the second and third most-streamed solos, at numbers 24 and 29 respectively, with the full-length version of the latter at number 38. The following month, Jimin earned his first entry on the Billboard Hot 100 with "Filter", which debuted at number 87 on the chart, as well his first number one on the World Digital Song Sales chart. The song set the record for the biggest streaming debut among all Korean songs on Spotify, accruing over 2.2 million streams in its first 24 hours of release, and went on to become the fastest Korean solo in the platform's history to surpass 20–60 million streams. It was also the only solo album track by BTS to receive a Song of the Year nomination at the Gaon Chart Music Awards. In March 2021, "Filter" became the 15th BTS song to spend a full year on Billboards World Digital Song Sales chart. It was the longest-charting Korean song released in 2020 on the ranking, having spent 80 weeks on the chart as of the issue dated October 9, 2021.

Jimin was awarded the fifth-class Hwagwan Order of Cultural Merit in 2018, alongside his bandmates, by the President of South Korea, Moon Jae-in, for their contributions to the promotion of Korean culture. Three years later, Moon appointed him Special Presidential Envoy for Future Generations and Culture, alongside his bandmates, to help "lead the global agenda for future generations" and "expand South Korea's diplomatic efforts and global standing" in the international community.

2014–present: Solo work 

In 2014, Jimin collaborated with bandmate Jungkook on a song called "Christmas Day", a Korean rendition of Justin Bieber's "Mistletoe"; Jimin wrote the Korean lyrics himself. The two collaborated again in 2017, on a cover of Charlie Puths "We Don't Talk Anymore" featuring Selena Gomez. Jungkook previously released a solo version of the song in February, and the two prepared the duet as a special gift to the band's fandom, releasing it on June 2, during BTS' fourth anniversary celebrations. Teen Vogue wrote that "adding Jimin's voice to the mix makes the rendition all the more lovely", while the Canadian outlet Flare magazine stated that "it honestly might be better than the original". Elite Daily described the cover as "nothing short of flawless".

Jimin appeared on several variety shows such as Hello Counselor, Please Take Care of My Refrigerator, and God's Workplace in 2016. He also served as a special MC on domestic television music programs such as Show! Music Core and M Countdown. In December 2016, he participated in a dance duet at the KBS Song Festival with Taemin from Shinee.

On December 30, 2018, Jimin released "Promise", his first credited song as a soloist, for free on BTS' SoundCloud page. It earned the biggest 24-hour debut in SoundCloud history with 8.5 million streams, surpassing previous record holder Drake's "Duppy Freestyle" which received 4.9 million streams, and would go on to become the most streamed song on the platform by December 2021, with over 300 million streams. Described by Billboard as a "mellow pop ballad", the song was composed by Jimin and Big Hit producer Slow Rabbit, who also produced the track, and features lyrics written by Jimin and bandmate RM. Jimin released his second solo song "Christmas Love", about his childhood memories of the holidays, on December 24, 2020. In 2022, he contributed the single "With You", a duet with Ha Sung-woon, to the soundtrack of the TvN drama Our Blues; the single was released on April 24.

In January 2023, Jimin co-wrote and featured on the single "Vibe" by Taeyang. His first official solo project since BTS announced an increased focus on individual music endeavors a year prior, the single earned Jimin his first entry on the Billboard Hot 100, at number 76. He was announced as a global ambassador for Dior later that month, and as a brand ambassador for Tiffany & Co. in March. "Promise" and "Christmas Love" were made available on streaming platforms worldwide as official singles under Jimin's name on March 6. His debut solo album Face is slated for release on March 24. It was preceded by the single "Set Me Free Pt. 2" and an accompanying music video on March 17, while a second single, "Like Crazy", and its music video will premiere alongside the album.

Artistry 

Jimin's vocals have been described as delicate and sweet. He is regarded as an exceptional dancer among the members of BTS and in K-pop in general, often praised for his "smooth and elegant movements" and charm on stage. In the documentary Burn the Stage, Jimin addressed his perfectionism, stating that even the smallest mistakes on stage make him feel guilty and stressed.

He has cited singer Rain as an inspiration and one of the reasons why he wanted to become a singer and performer.

Impact and influence 
In 2016, Jimin was ranked as the 14th most popular idol in an annual survey conducted by Gallup Korea. He subsequently ranked seventh in 2017, and then consecutively ranked first in 2018 and 2019, as the only idol to top the survey for two consecutive years. In 2018, Jimin was the ninth most-tweeted about celebrity and the eighth most-tweeted about musician globally. He was named the 17th best boy band member in history by The Guardian. From January to May 2018, Jimin won the monthly "Top K-Pop Artist–Individual" award for Peeper x Billboard, a collaboration between the Peeper social media app and Billboard Korea that collects fan votes for their favorite K-pop artists. The prize was a donation to UNICEF in his name.

The Cultural Conservation Society awarded Jimin a plaque of appreciation in 2019, for performing buchaechum, a traditional Korean fan dance, during the 2018 Melon Music Awards and helping spread the dance outside of Korea. In October 2021, he became the first idol to spend 34 consecutive months atop the brand reputation ranking for individual boy group idols and the only one to top the overall ranking for three consecutive years.

Jimin is often cited as a role model by various idols in the K-pop industry, many of whom try to emulate his style of dance, mannerisms, and stage presence; media outlets have called him the "Idol of Idols", "Idol's Bible", and "Rookies' Bible". Artists who have cited him as an influence include Arthur of Kingdom, Bic of MCND, Kim Si-hun of BDC, Woochul of Newkidd, Hyunjin of Stray Kids, Wooyoung of Ateez, Lim Se-jun of Victon, Huening Kai and Beomgyu of Tomorrow X Together, and Ni-ki and Jay of Enhypen. British internet personality Oli London underwent 18 cosmetic surgeries costing up to £150,000 to resemble Jimin.

Philanthropy 
Jimin is a supporter of education and the arts. From 2016 to 2018, he covered uniform expenses of students at his alma mater, Busan Hodong Elementary School. After the school's closing was announced, he donated summer and winter middle school uniforms to the final graduates and gifted autographed albums to the entire student body. In early 2019, Jimin donated KRW₩100 million (US$88,000) to the Busan Department of Education to help support students from low income families. Of the total, ₩30 million ($23,000) went to his alma mater, Busan Arts High School. In July 2020, he donated ₩100 million to the Jeonnam Future Education Foundation to fund the creation of a scholarship fund for talented students from South Jeolla Province who were struggling financially. In September 2022, Jimin made a personal donation to the Gangwon-do Education Office.

In July 2021, Jimin donated ₩100 million to Rotary International to help polio patients. As with previous donations, the benefaction was made privately but became public in September, when the Go-seong Rotary Club displayed a banner thanking him for the donation. He was announced as a member of the Green Noble Club, a group of major donors to the Green Umbrella Children's Foundation who have made donations of ₩100 million or more, on October 12. In February 2023, he donated , through the Korean UNICEF Committee, towards emergency relief for children affected by the Turkey–Syria earthquake.

Personal life 
Since 2018, Jimin has lived in Hannam-dong, Seoul, South Korea, with his bandmates. In 2021, he purchased property in the area worth US$5.3 million.

Health 
In 2017, during BTS' Wings Tour, Jimin was unable to participate in the show in Macau due to neck and shoulder cramping. The following year, while in London for the Love Yourself World Tour, he withdrew from the band's scheduled performance on The Graham Norton Show because of "severe muscle pain in his neck and back", according to a statement released by Big Hit Entertainment.

Discography

Studio albums 
 Face (2023)

Singles

As lead artist

As featured artist

Other charted songs

Other songs

Writing credits 
All song credits are adapted from the Korea Music Copyright Association's database, unless otherwise noted.

Filmography

Trailers and short films

Hosting

Awards and nominations

Notes

References

External links 

1995 births
Living people
Musicians from Busan
Japanese-language singers of South Korea
English-language singers from South Korea
South Korean pop singers
South Korean singer-songwriters
South Korean male idols
South Korean male singers
South Korean tenors
BTS members
21st-century South Korean singers
Recipients of the Order of Cultural Merit (Korea)
Hybe Corporation artists